Emin Nouri (born 22 July 1985) is a former professional footballer. He was born in Bulgaria and represented Sweden as a youth. He then represented Azerbaijan at senior level.

Career
Nouri was born in Kardzhali, Bulgaria, and is from the Turkish Bulgarian minority group. He joined Östers IF 1996 from local side Växjö Norra. Nouri has also played for the Swedish national U-21 team.

In 2014, he was called up to the Azerbaijan national football team by manager Berti Vogts for a match against Uzbekistan.

References

External links

1985 births
Living people
People from Kardzhali
Association football defenders
Azerbaijani footballers
Azerbaijan international footballers
Swedish footballers
Sweden under-21 international footballers
Bulgarian footballers
Azerbaijani people of Turkish descent
Bulgarian people of Turkish descent
Swedish people of Turkish descent
Bulgarian emigrants to Sweden
Östers IF players
Kalmar FF players
Allsvenskan players